Percy Snell was an American football, basketball, and baseball coach. He served as the head football coach at Aurora University from 1926 to 1938.

Snell was also the head basketball coach at Aurora from 1926 to 1932, where he compiled a record of 19–53, and later for one year at Quincy University where his teams went 13–9 during the 1946–47 season.

In addition, Snell was the head baseball coach at Aurora from 1926 to 1932, posting a record of 25–43 as that program's first ever coach.

The baseball field that Aurora University played their home games at for nearly 50 years was named in his honor.

Head coaching record

Football

References

Year of birth missing
Year of death missing
Aurora Spartans baseball coaches
Aurora Spartans football coaches
Aurora Spartans men's basketball coaches
Quincy Hawks men's basketball coaches